John Hutton (Clyde, New Zealand 8 August 1906 – 1978) was a New Zealand prominent glass engraving artist, who spent most of his career in the United Kingdom.

Life
 
Born in Clyde on the South Island of New Zealand in 1906, he married fellow artist Helen (Nell) Blair in 1934 and they made England their permanent home in 1936. They lived for a while in an artists' commune at Assington Hall in Suffolk. John worked on several mural commissions until the war broke out in 1939.

During the war he joined a camouflage unit where he met and worked with the architect Basil Spence - a relationship which was to prove invaluable later on. In 1947 he designed his first large scale glass engravings - a series of four panels depicting the seasons for the restaurant area on the Cunard ship Caronia. By 1953 he had developed a unique method of engraving using a grinding wheel attached to a flexible drive.

John and Helen had three children: Warwick Hutton, an artist, Macaillan Hutton, an architect, and Peter Hutton, a teacher.

John had used an artist's model, Marigold Dodson, to pose for many of the figures in his artwork. His first marriage ended during this period and he eventually married Marigold in 1963, though he still did work with his former wife subsequently on joint art projects.
John and Marigold had one daughter: Katie Hutton.

In 1975 he became first Vice President of the newly founded British Guild of Glass Engravers (Laurence Whistler was first President and Queen Elizabeth The Queen Mother was its first Patron).

Hutton worked on until 1978 when he finally succumbed to cancer. His ashes were appropriately buried beneath a stone at the foot of his finest work - the screen at Coventry Cathedral.

Commissions

Coventry Cathedral

Hutton is most famous for his glass engravings on the Great West Screen of Coventry Cathedral, UK, known as the "Screen of Saints and Angels", 66 larger-than-life figures that took ten years of creation (e.g. the angel of annunciation, the angel of the resurrection, the angel of the measuring rod), for which he received instant acclaim in 1962.

A pane of the window, depicting The Angel with the Eternal Gospel, was smashed during a burglary, in January 2020.

Guildford Cathedral
He designed and engraved six larger-than-life Angels for the West doors of Guildford Cathedral (Surrey England) also designed three angels over the South Transept doors

Shakespeare Centre
He designed glass engravings at the Shakespeare Centre at Stratford-upon-Avon, UK, (Ophelia, Macbeth, Romeo and Juliet etc.).

National Library and Archives
At Ottawa, Ontario, Canada, he created glass engravings of the National Library and Archives, a total of 37 panels over three floors with main theme world literature: larger than life figures of Cervantes, Shakespeare, Molière, Tolstoy etc., also Apollo and the Nine Muses.

Dunkirk Memorial
Hutton produced the glass pane at the Dunkirk Memorial (1957).

At the Civic Centre of Newcastle upon Tyne, UK, he created a glass screen representing some of the great inventions of the city and also figures from local mythology with his son, Warwick Hutton.

Plymouth Civic Centre
He also created a glass screen of four mermaids at Plymouth Civic Centre, UK, and designed three glass panel designs for the entrance hall balcony at Mercury House, London, UK.

Thanks-Giving Square
In 1975 Hutton designed 'The Spirit of Thanksgiving' for Thanks-Giving Square in Dallas, Texas, his first large project in the United States. Above the entryway to the non-denominational Chapel of Thanksgiving a large engraved window features a deeply-cut, three dimensional dove surrounded by circular surface effects. Representing the divine in some religions, Hutton said that "the dove is a symbol used throughout history to depict beauty, peace, hope and thanksgiving."

Bucklersbury House
In 1960, John Hutton created 24 panels to commemorate the discovery of the ruins of the Temple of Mithras on the site of the now demolished Bucklersbury House. In 2015 the panels were relocated to the new entrance to Bank station, beneath the Bloomberg building.

Other
Some of his pieces of art are also exhibited at the Corning Museum of Glass, USA.

Gallery of John Hutton's works

Books
Brentnall, Margaret and Marigold Hutton. John Hutton: Artist and Glass Engraver. Philadelphia: The Art Alliance Press, 1986.  Several appendices document Hutton's work (mural paintings, glass and other media; U.S. installations include one at Corning Museum of Glass and two in Texas). Hard cover, 216 pages 
John Hutton's Glass Engravings. © Minister of Supply and Services Canada 1993, Cat. No. SN3-283/1993 
Hutton, John. John Hutton's Glass Engravings : Les Gravures Sur Verre De John Hutton. January 1977 
John Hutton, Engraved Glass, Drawings, Paintings. Frank No: 1117, Commonwealth Institute, UK, 1969 ISBN No. Duncan No., 16 pages (Exhibition catalogue at the Commonwealth Institute Art Gallery, London) 
George Thomas Noszlopy. Public sculpture of Warwickshire, Coventry and Solihull, Series: Liverpool University Press - Public Sculpture of Britain,  . Published March 2003. P.54-55: Entrance to the Shakespeare's Birthplace Trust Gallery in Stratford upon Avon - Characters from the Works of Shakespeare (Hutton's glass engravings)
 Hutton,John The West Window at Coventry Cathedral English Counties Periodicals Ltd, ?1962, 29 pages, illustrated.

References

External links

Engravings of National Library at Ottawa, Ontario, Canada

Categories

Hutton, John (Artist)
Hutton, John (Artist)
20th-century engravers
Hutton, John (Artist)
Hutton, John (Artist)
Hutton, John (Artist)
People from Clyde, New Zealand
New Zealand emigrants to the United Kingdom
20th-century British printmakers
New Zealand glass artists